Mycteroptidae are a family of eurypterids, a group of extinct chelicerate arthropods commonly known as "sea scorpions". The family is one of three families contained in the superfamily Mycteropoidea (along with Hibbertopteridae and Drepanopteridae), which in turn is one of four superfamilies classified as part of the suborder Stylonurina.

Mycteroptids were sweep-feeding eurypterids known from the Late Carboniferous to the Late Permian.

Description 
Mycteroptids were medium-sized to fairly large mycteropoids with parabolic prosoma and a hastate telson with paired ventral keels. They had a culticular ornament of scales or mucrones and unlike the hibbertopterids, appendage IV was non-spiniferous. The first and second opisthosomal tergites were strongly developed and elongated. The heads of mycteroptids were subtrapezoid in shape with small compound eyes.

Mycteroptids only used appendages II and III to capture prey, whilst hibberopterids used II, III and IV.

Genera and species
Three of the four genera included in the Mycteroptidae, Mycterops, Woodwardopterus and Megarachne might represent different ontogenetic stages of each other based on the sizes of the referred specimens and the patterns of mucronation. This would sink the genera Woodwardopterus and Megarachne into Mycterops.

Family Mycteroptidae Cope, 1886
 Mycterops Cope, 1886
 ?Mycterops blairi Waterston, 1968
 Mycterops matthieui Pruvost, 1924
 Mycterops ordinatus Cope, 1886
 ?Mycterops whitei Schram, 1984
 Woodwardopterus Kjellesvig-Waering, 1959
 Woodwardopterus scabrosus (Woodward, 1887)
 Woodwardopterus freemanorum Poschmanna & Rozefelds, 2021
 Megarachne Hünicken, 1980
 Megarachne servinei Hünicken, 1980
Hastimima White, 1908
Hastimima whitei White, 1908

See also

 List of eurypterids
 Stylonurina
 Hibbertopteroidea
 Hibbertopteridae

References 

Stylonurina
Pennsylvanian first appearances
Permian extinctions
Prehistoric arthropod families